Brad Beck (born February 10, 1964 in Vancouver) is a Canadian former professional ice hockey defenceman. He was drafted in the 5th round, 91st overall by the Chicago Blackhawks in the 1982 NHL Entry Draft. He never played a single game in NHL but spent two seasons in IHL in Saginaw before heading into Europe.

Career statistics

External links

1964 births
Canadian expatriate ice hockey players in Finland
Saginaw Generals players
Saginaw Hawks players
Ässät players
Indianapolis Ice players
Durham Wasps players
Living people
Chicago Blackhawks draft picks
Penticton Knights players
Michigan State Spartans men's ice hockey players
Richmond Renegades players
Flint Bulldogs players